The Festival des traditions du monde (World Traditions Festival) is an annual event in Sherbrooke, Quebec that celebrates various cultures from around the world. It has been hosted at the Quintal Park since its debut in 1998. It is open to the public at a small cost and is home to a variety of multicultural performances, food vendors, and artisans.

References

External links
Official website

Summer festivals
Recurring events established in 1998
Festivals in Quebec
Culture of Sherbrooke